Sylvain Nicolas (born 21 June 1987) is a French rugby union player. His position is Flanker and he currently plays for Stade Français in the Top 14. He began his career with home-town club Bourgoin-Jallieu before moving to Stade Toulousain in 2010. In 2013 he signed for Stade Français.

References

1987 births
Living people
French rugby union players
People from Bourgoin-Jallieu
Stade Toulousain players
Rugby union flankers
Sportspeople from Isère